The  is a major Japanese railway line of the Japan Railways Group (JR Group) network, connecting  and  stations. The high-speed Tōkaidō Shinkansen largely parallels the line.

The term "Tōkaidō Main Line" is largely a holdover from pre-Shinkansen days; now various portions of the line have different names which are officially used by JR East, JR Central, and JR West. Today, the only daily passenger train that travels the entire length of the line is the combined overnight-train Sunrise Izumo - Sunrise Seto. During the day longer intercity trips using the line require several transfers along the way.

The Tokaido Main Line is owned and operated by three JR companies:
 East Japan Railway Company (JR East) ( - ) Tōkaidō Line
 Central Japan Railway Company (JR Central) ( - ) Tōkaidō Line
 West Japan Railway Company (JR West) ( - ) Biwako Line, JR Kyoto Line, JR Kobe Line

Basic data
Total distance:  (including branch lines; Tokyo – Kōbe is )
East Japan Railway Company (JR East) (Services and tracks)
Tokyo – Atami: 
Shinagawa – Shin-Kawasaki – Tsurumi: 
Hamamatsuchō – Tokyo Freight Terminal – Kawasaki Freight Terminal – Hama-Kawasaki:  (Tōkaidō Freight Line)
Tsurumi – Hatchō-Nawate:  (Tōkaidō Freight Line)
Tsurumi – Higashi-Takashima – Sakuragichō:  (Takashima Line)
Tsurumi – Yokohama-Hazawa – Higashi-Totsuka:  (Tōkaidō Freight Line)
Central Japan Railway Company (JR Central) (Services and tracks)
Atami – Maibara:  ( between Kanayama – Nagoya overlaps with Chuo Main Line)
Ōgaki – Mino-Akasaka:  (Mino-Akasaka branch line)
Ōgaki – (Shin-Tarui) – Sekigahara:  (Shin-Tarui Line)
West Japan Railway Company (JR West) (Services and tracks)
Maibara – Kōbe: 
Kyōto Freight Terminal – Tambaguchi:  (not in use by passenger trains)
Suita – (Miyahara Rail Yard) – Amagasaki:  (Hoppō Freight Line)
Suita – Umeda – Fukushima:  (Umeda Freight Line, used by Haruka and Kuroshio limited expresses)
Japan Freight Railway Company (JR Freight) (Tracks and services)
Sannō Signal – Nagoya-Minato:  (Nagoya-Minato Line)
Suita Signal – Osaka Freight Terminal:  (Osaka Terminal Line)
Japan Freight Railway Company (JR Freight) (Services only)
Shinagawa – Atami: 
Shinagawa – Shin-Tsurumi Signal: 
Tokyo Freight Terminal – Hama-Kawasaki: 
Tsurumi – Yokohama-Hazawa – Higashi-Totsuka: 
Tsurumi – Hatchō-Nawate: 
Tsurumi – Shinkō – Sakuragichō:  
Atami – Maibara:  
Minami-Arao Signal – Sekigahara:  
Minami-Arao Signal – Mino-Akasaka:  
Maibara – Kōbe:  (via Hoppō Freight Line)
Kyōto Freight Terminal – Tambaguchi: 
Suita – Umeda – Fukushima: 
Gauge:  Narrow gauge railway
Stations:
 Passenger: 166 (does not include Shinagawa – Shin-Kawasaki – Tsurumi section or branches other than Mino-Akasaka branch line)
 JR East: 34
 JR Central: 82
 JR West: 50
 Freight only: 14
Tracks: 
 Four or more
 Tokyo – Odawara: 
 Nagoya – Inazawa: 
 Kusatsu – Kōbe: 
 Two
 Odawara – Nagoya
 Inazawa – Kusatsu
 Shinagawa – Shin-Kawasaki – Tsurumi
 Hamamatsuchō – Tokyo Freight Terminal – Kawasaki Freight Terminal – Hama-Kawasaki
 Tsurumi – Hatchō-Nawate
 Tsurumi – Higashi-Takashima
 Tsurumi – Yokohama-Hazawa – Higashi-Totsuka
 Suita – Umeda
 Suita – (Miyahara Rail Yard) – Amagasaki
 Single-track: All other sections
Electrification: 1,500 V DC (except for Sannō Signal – Nagoya-Minato)
Railway signalling: Automatic Train Control
Maximum speed:
Tokyo – Ōfuna, Odawara – Toyohashi: 
Ōfuna – Odawara, Toyohashi – Maibara: 
Minami-Arao Signal – Tarui – Sekigahara, Minami-Arao Signal – Mino-Akasaka: 
Maibara – Kōbe:  (Special Rapid Shin-Kaisoku only, local trains max at 120 km/h or 75 mph)

Station list

JR East 

The section between Tokyo and Atami is operated by East Japan Railway Company (JR East) and it is located in the Greater Tokyo Area. It has local services and a rapid service called Rapid Acty. It runs on dedicated tracks parallel to the Yamanote Line between Tokyo and Shinagawa, the Keihin-Tōhoku Line between Tokyo and Yokohama, and the Yokosuka Line between Yokohama and Ōfuna. Some Shōnan–Shinjuku Line trains share the segment south of Yokohama to Ōfuna and Odawara. Until 12 March 2021, there were also commuter rapid and Shōnan Liner services.

The Ueno–Tokyo Line, a JR East project, extended the services of the Utsunomiya Line, the Takasaki Line, and the Joban Line to Tokyo Station, allowing for through services to and from the Tōkaidō Line from March 2015.

Almost all trains along this section of the line have bi-level "Green Cars" with forward-facing seats, with each set of trains having 2 of them. Green Cars can be used after paying an additional fee.

A new station between Ōfuna and Fujisawa is being planned to serve passengers near the former JR Freight Shōnan Freight Terminal. Construction is expected to start in early 2022. The new station is expected to open for service in 2032.

Legend:
 ● : a station that all trains stop
｜ :a station that all trains pass
 ▲ : a station that Shōnan–Shinjuku Line trains use Yokosuka Line platforms

 Some trains run through services beyond Atami, as far as Numazu. 
With the Ueno-Tokyo Line, Utsunomiya Line Rapid Rabbit and Takasaki Line Rapid Urban services now run along the Tokaido Line, and stop at all stations on this line. As such, the two services are classified as 'Local' service trains within the Tokaido Line. 
Tokaido Line Rapid Acty services operate only evening services from Tokyo to Odawara. Rapid Acty services will be discontinued effective the timetable revision on 18 March 2023 after 34 years of operation.
Shōnan Limited Express services are special, all-reserved commuter express trains with comfortable seating. They operate from Odawara to Tokyo on weekday mornings, with a few services terminating in Shinagawa. Return services run from Tokyo to Odawara on weekday evenings. Like commuter rapid trains, Shōnan Liner services normally make no stops between Shinagawa and Fujisawa. Between Fujisawa and Odawara, varying stops are made. In addition to the standard fare, a reserved seat fee of ¥500 is required to use the Shōnan Liner.
 Keihin-Tōhoku Line stations between Tokyo and Yokohama officially are a part of the Tōkaidō Main Line.
 Yokosuka Line stations between Tokyo and Ōfuna officially are a part of the Tōkaidō Main Line. The route of the Yokosuka Line between Shinagawa and Tsurumi is separate from the main line and is referred to as the Hinkaku Line, on which Nishi-Ōi, Musashi-Kosugi, and Shin-Kawasaki stations are located.
 Shōnan–Shinjuku Line operates through services to the Tōkaidō Main Line. Rapid Service stop at all stations on the Tōkaidō Main Line (Totsuka - Odawara), while Special Rapid Service operate the same pattern as a Rapid Acty Service.

JR Central 
The point between JR East and JR Central operation is divided at Atami station, where section between Atami and Maibara is operated by JR Central, and covers the Tōkai region - Shizuoka Prefecture, Aichi Prefecture, and Gifu Prefecture. Some services from Odawara on the JR East section continues to travel on this section until Numazu station.

Shizuoka Block

Nagoya Block Main Line 

Maibara is shared by JR Central and JR West; JR West manages the station

Before March 2016, JR West operated trains from Maibara as far as Ogaki on JR Central territory. After the two companies realized this invasion, on 25 March 2016, all JR West departures were changed to JR Central trains to Maibara station.

Branch lines

Mino-Akasaka Branch Line

Tarui Branch Line
Between Ōgaki and Sekigahara, there is a 25 per mil grade. In 1944, a single track bypass was built to avoid this steep slope of the main line and the old westbound track was removed.

JR West
The western part of the Tōkaidō Main Line from Maibara to Kōbe is operated by JR West and forms the main trunk of the company's Urban Network in the Osaka-Kobe-Kyoto metropolitan area. Although the line is divided into three segments, known as the Biwako Line, JR Kyoto Line, and JR Kobe Line, they are part of a single contiguous network, with many services traversing multiple sections. The Biwako Line includes a segment of the Hokuriku Main Line. Some services on the Kosei, JR Takarazuka and Gakkentoshi lines run through onto the Tōkaidō Main Line.

Biwako Line 

The section between Maibara and Kyoto is known as the Biwako Line.

●: Trains stop.
○: Limited stop, early morning and late night only
|: Trains pass.
Local (4-door Commuter trains): JR Kyoto Line local trains
Local (3-door Suburban trains): Operate as Rapid service trains west of Takatsuki (west of Kyoto in the morning)

JR Kyoto Line 

The section between Kyoto and Osaka is known as the JR Kyoto Line. Trains from the Biwako and Kosei lines travel through onto the JR Kyoto Line and continue west towards the JR Kobe Line at Osaka.

Legend:

 ● : All trains stop
 | : All trains pass
 ▲ : Trains only after morning rush stop

Local trains stop at all stations. Rapid trains in the morning skip some stops between Kyoto and Takatsuki.

JR Kobe Line 

Although Kōbe is the official terminus of the Tōkaidō Main Line, most trains continue to Nishi-Akashi, Himeji and beyond.

●: Trains stop at all times
｜: Trains pass at all times
▲: Eastbound trains pass in the morning
○:Trains stop at morning 
of Weekdays only

Limited express services
In addition to standard local, rapid, and special rapid service trains, the Tōkaidō Main Line also hosts a number of limited express services.

Daytime trains
Biwako Express: Maibara – Osaka
Fujikawa: Shizuoka – Fuji – (Minobu Line) – Kōfu
Haruka: Yasu - Kyoto – Shin-Osaka – (Osaka Loop Line) – Tennōji – (Hanwa Line) – Hineno – (Kansai Airport Line) – Kansai International Airport
Hida: Nagoya / Osaka – Gifu – (Takayama Main Line) – Takayama
Odoriko: Tokyo – Atami – (Itō Line) – Itō – (Izu Kyūkō) – Shimoda; Tokyo – Mishima – (Izuhakone Railway Sunzu Line) – Shuzenji
Thunderbird: Osaka – Kyoto – (Kosei Line) – Tsuruga – (Hokuriku Main Line) – Kanazawa
Saphir Odoriko: Tokyo – Atami – (Itō Line) – Itō – (Izu Kyūkō) – Izukyu-Shimoda
Shirasagi: Nagoya – Maibara – (Hokuriku Main Line) – Kanazawa 
Shōnan: Tokyo – Odawara

Overnight trains
Overnight trains on the Tōkaidō Line go from Tokyo to western Honshū and Shikoku.

Sunrise Izumo (Tokyo – Izumo via Okayama) (Operates daily)
Sunrise Seto (Tokyo – Takamatsu) (Operates daily)

Discontinued trains
Overnight limited express Sakura (Tokyo – Nagasaki (discontinued March 2005), Tokyo –  (discontinued 1999))
Overnight limited express Izumo (Tokyo – Izumo via Tottori), discontinued March 2006
Limited express Wide View Tōkai (Tokyo – Shizuoka), discontinued March 2007
Overnight express Ginga (Tokyo – Osaka), discontinued March 2008
Overnight limited express Fuji (Tokyo – Ōita), discontinued March 2009
Overnight limited express Hayabusa (Tokyo – Kumamoto), discontinued March 2009
Overnight limited express Sunrise Yume (Tokyo – Hiroshima), discontinued March 2009
Moonlight Nagara (Tokyo – Ōgaki) (Operates seasonally - rapid service with reserved seats), discontinued March 2020
Super View Odoriko, Resort Odoriko, Fleur Odoriko (Tokyo – Izukyu-Shimoda), discontinued March 2020

Rolling stock for local and rapid services

JR East 

E231-1000 series (Tokyo – Atami – Numazu, through services onto the Itō Line)
E233-3000 series (Tokyo – Atami – Numazu, through services onto the Itō Line)
E257-2000/2500 series (Odoriko, Shōnan: Ikebukuro/Tokyo – Atami, through service onto the Itō Line)
E261 series (Saphir Odoriko: Shinjuku/Tokyo – Atami, through service onto the Itō Line)

JR Central 

211-5000 series (Atami – Toyohashi, through services onto the Gotemba Line)
211-6000 series (Atami – Toyohashi, through services onto the Gotemba Line, through services onto the Minobu Line)
311 series (Shizuoka – Kakegawa – Hamamatsu – Toyohashi – Gifu)
313-0 series (Hamamatsu – Toyohashi – Gifu – Ōgaki)
313-300 series (Hamamatsu – Toyohashi – Gifu – Ōgaki, Ōgaki – Mino-Akasaka)
313-2300 series (Atami – Toyohashi, through services onto the Gotemba Line, through services onto the Minobu Line)
313-2500 series (Atami – Toyohashi, through services onto the Gotemba Line, through services onto the Minobu Line)
313-2600 series (Atami – Toyohashi, through services onto the Gotemba Line, through services onto the Minobu Line)
313-3000 series (through services onto the Gotemba Line, through services onto the Minobu Line)
313-3100 series (through services onto the Gotemba Line, through services onto the Minobu Line)
313-5000 series (Hamamatsu – Toyohashi – Gifu – Ōgaki – Maibara)
373 series (Atami – – Shizuoka, Hamamatsu – Toyohashi, Ōgaki – Maibara)
KiHa 85 series (Nagoya / Osaka – Gifu, through service on the Takayama Main Line)
HC85 series (Nagoya / Osaka – Gifu, through service on the Takayama Main Line)

JR West 

681 series (Nagoya – Ōgaki – Sekigahara)
683-8000 series (Nagoya – Ōgaki – Sekigahara)
281 series|271 series (Yasu - Shin-Osaka)
207 series|321 series (Kusatsu - Kobe)
221 series|223 series|225 series(Maibara - Kobe)

Former rolling stock
KiHa 75 (through services onto the Taketoyo Line, 1999 - March 2015)
113-1000 series (April 1972 - March 2006)
185 series (Tokyo – Atami, Misima through services onto the Itō Line, March 1981 - March 2021)
211 series (Tokyo – Atami – Numazu, through services onto the Itō Line, 1985 - April 2012)
215 series (Tokyo – Atami, 1992 - March 2021)
E217 series (Tokyo – Atami, March 2006 - March 2015)
251 series (Ikebukuro/Tokyo, Atami, through service onto the Itō Line, April 1990 - March 2020)
651 series (Izu Craile services: Odawara – Atami, through service onto the Itō Line, July 2016 - June 2020)

History

The Tōkaidō route takes its name from the ancient road connecting the Kansai region (Kyoto, Osaka) with the Kantō region (Tokyo, then Edo) through the Tōkai region (including Nagoya). Literally, it was the Tōkai road, or Road through Tōkai. The Tōkaidō Line does not follow the old road exactly, since the latter diverges at Nagoya toward the Mie Prefecture coastline; to follow it by train, the Kansai Main Line and Kusatsu Line would have to be followed from Nagoya to Kusatsu. The largest population centers in Japan are along this route - Tokyo, Yokohama, Nagoya, Kyoto, Osaka and Kobe. These centers have grown to occupy an ever more dominant role in the country's government, financial, manufacturing and cultural life.

Historically, one of the first priorities of Japanese railway planners was to build a line from Tokyo to the Kansai region, either following the Tokaido route or the northern Nakasendō route. This decision remained unresolved as regional needs were addressed. The first railway in Japan was the line from Shimbashi to Sakuragicho in Yokohama, which opened in 1872; another segment of today's Tokaido Main Line, between Kyoto and Kobe, opened in 1877.

In 1883, the government decided to use the Nakasendo route, and construction of several segments commenced (including the modern-day Takasaki Line). Railways were opened between Ogaki and Nagahama (1884) and between Nagoya and Kisogawa (1886) in line with the Nakasendo plan. However, by 1886, it was clear that the Tokaido route would be more practical, and so the Nakasendo plan was abandoned.

The lines between Kisogawa and Ogaki, Yokohama and Kozu, and Hamamatsu and Obu were completed in 1887, and the first line from Tokyo to Kobe was completed in 1889, when Kozu and Hamamatsu were connected through the present-day Gotemba Line corridor, and the final segments were completed between Kasumigahara and Otsu. At the time, there was one Tokyo-Kobe train in each direction per day, taking over 20 hours each way.

The "Tokaido Line" name was formally adopted in 1895. In October 1895, following the Sino-Japanese War, through service to the Sanyo Railway (now Sanyo Main Line) began. Express service between Tokyo and Kobe began in 1896, sleeper service in 1900, and dining car service in 1901.

Automatic couplers were introduced on all freight wagons in 1926. In 1930, the first Tsubame ("swallow") express was introduced, reducing the Tokyo - Kobe travel-time to nine hours - a significant reduction from the twenty hours required in 1889 and fifteen in 1903.

This was the last major change to the alignment of the route.

By the early 1950s the Tōkaidō Line had become the main transportation artery of Japan. Although it was only 3% of the railway system by length, it carried 24% of JNR's passenger traffic and 23% of its freight, and the rate of growth was higher than any other line in the country. By 1956 electrification was completed along the Tokyo-Osaka section and with the introduction of new Kodama trains, travel time was reduced to six and a half hours. The line became so popular that tickets regularly sold out within ten minutes of being put on sale, one month in advance of the travel date.

The capacity constraints on the Tokaido Main Line had been clear prior to World War II, and work started on a new  standard gauge "bullet train" line in 1940. Intercity passenger traffic between Tokyo, Nagoya and Osaka largely transferred to the Tōkaidō Shinkansen after it was completed in 1964. Since then, the Tokaido Main Line has been used as a commuter and freight line, serving a very small number of long-distance passenger trains (mainly overnight and sleeper services).

Following the Hanshin earthquake on 17 January 1995, the line was shut down between Takatsuki and Kobe, with certain segments remaining impassable until 1 April of that year.

On 20 August 2016, station numbering was introduced with stations between Tokyo and Osaki being assigned station numbers between JT01 and JT07. Numbers increase towards in the southbound direction towards Osaki. Station numbers would be assigned to stations beyond Osaki as far as Atami in 2018.

Former connecting lines

Kanagawa Prefecture
 Ninomiya Station: The Shonan Horse-drawn Tramway opened a  line to Hatano in 1906 to haul tobacco. Steam locomotion was introduced in 1913. Passenger services ceased in 1933, and the line closed in 1935.
 Odawara Station: The Japan Tobacco and Salt Public Corporation operated an approximately 1 km line to its factory, electrified at 1,500 V DC, between 1950 and 1984. The line was also serviced by the adjoining Odakyu Odawara Line from its Ashigara station.

Shizuoka Prefecture
 Atami Station: In 1895, a   gauge handcar line opened to Yoshihama, and was extended  to Odawara the following year. In 1907, the line was converted to  gauge and steam locomotives were introduced. The line closed in 1923 as a result of the Great Kanto earthquake.
 Numazu Station: The Sunzu Electric Railway opened a  line to Mishima-Tamachi on the Izuhakone Railway Sunzu Line in 1906. In 1915, the line was truncated 1 km to connect at Mishima-Hirokoji, and the line was electrified at 600 V DC in 1919. The line closed in 1961 following the destruction of the Kisegawa bridge during a flood.
 Yoshiwara Station: The  opened a  gauge line to Ōmiya (presentday Fujinomiya) in 1890. The  purchased the tramway in 1912, converted it to a  gauge steam railway the following year and gradually extended it (eventually becoming the Minobu Line). In 1924, the company built a new alignment which connected to Fuji station on the Tokaido main line, at which time the original section from Omiya to Yoshiwara closed.
 Shimizu Station: Shimizukō Line from 1916 to 1984.
 Shizuoka Station:
 The Abe Railway opened a   gauge line from Inomiya (approximately 2 km from Shizuoka) to Ushizuma in 1914 to haul timber. Plans to extend the line to Shizuoka did not eventuate and the line closed in 1934.
The Shizuoka Electric Railway opened a  line to Anzai, connecting to its Shimizu Line, electrified at 600 V DC, between 1922 and 1926. The line closed in 1962.
 Yaizu Station: A   handcar line operated to Fujieda between 1891 and 1900.
In 1943, the company merged with the Shizuoka Railway (see Fujiroi Station below), and in 1948, a  line between Mitsumata and Jitogata opened, linking the two sections. This section of the combined line closed between 1964 and 1970.
 Shimada Station: The Fuji Prefectural Government opened a   gauge handcar line in 1898 to haul timber. In 1944, following the destruction of the nearby Tokaido Line bridge over the Oigawa, it was proposed to use the alignment of this line as a replacement, including a  wooden bridge over the river. The bridge was about 25% completed when the end of the war resulted in the termination of the proposal. A diesel locomotive was introduced in 1955 to haul construction material for the construction of the adjacent national highway, and the line closed in 1959.
 Kikukawa Station: The Joto horse-drawn tramway opened a   gauge line to Ikeshinden in 1899. In 1923, the line was converted to  gauge, and a single-cylinder diesel locomotive introduced. The line closed in 1935.
 Fukuroi Station:
The Akiba horse-drawn tramway opened a   gauge line to Enshumori-Cho in 1902. In 1926, the company renamed itself the Shizuoka Electric Railway, converted the line to  gauge and electrified it at 600 V DC. The line closed in 1962.
The Shizuoka Railway opened a   gauge line to Yokosuka in 1914, extending it  to Mitsumata in 1927. The company merged with the Fuji-sho Railway in 1943 (see Fujieda Station above), and in 1948, a  line between Mitsumata and Jitogata opened, linking the two sections. This section of the combined line closed between 1964 and 1967.
In 1919, the line was acquired by the Enshu Railway Line, which closed the first  of the line in 1925, so the new connecting station became Enshu-Magome. The line closed in 1937 while the secion to Enshu-Magome would close in 1985.

Aichi Prefecture
 Okazaki Station:
 The Nishio Railway opened a  gauge line to Nishio in 1911, and extended it to Kira-Yoshida on the Meitetsu Gamagōri Line between 1915 and 1916. In 1926, the company merged with the Aichi Electric Railway, which between 1928 and 1929 converted the line to  gauge, electrified it at 600 V DC, and connected it to the line from Shin-Anjō on the Meitetsu Nagoya Main Line at Nishioguchi. The line to Nishio closed in 1962.
A  tram line connected to the Meitetsu Koromo line at Okazaki-Ida Station, which between 1929 and 1962 connected to the Meitetsu Mikawa Line at Uwagoromo, the tramway also closing in 1962.
 Owari-Ichinomiya Station: The  Meitetsu line to Okoshi, electrified at 600 V DC, opened in 1924. When the voltage on the Meitetsu main line was increased to 1,500 V DC in 1952, services were suspended on this line. The substitute bus service proved so popular the line was closed rather than upgraded.

Gifu Prefecture
 Ogaki Station: The Seino Railway opened a  line from Mino-Akasaka to Ichihashi in 1928, and operated a passenger service from 1930 to 1945.
 Arao Station (on the Mino Akasaka branch): A  freight-only line to the Mino Okubo limestone quarry operated between 1928 and 1990.

Hyōgo Prefecture
 Nishinomiya Station: A  freight-only line was opened in 1944 to connect to Mukogawa Station on the Hanshin Main Line. As the former was  gauge, and the latter  gauge, some tracks at Mukogawa were dual gauge. Service on the line ceased in 1958, but it was not formally closed until 1970.
 Rokkomichi Station: A  line to Kobe Port opened in 1907, electrified at 1,500 V DC. Passenger services ceased in 1974, and the line closed in 2003.

References

External links

 Stations of the Tōkaidō Main Line (JR East) 

 
Lines of East Japan Railway Company
Railway lines in Tokyo
Lines of Central Japan Railway Company
Lines of West Japan Railway Company
1067 mm gauge railways in Japan
Railway lines opened in 1872
1872 establishments in Japan
1500 V DC railway electrification